Leucosyrinx amycus is a species of sea snail, a marine gastropod mollusk in the family Pseudomelatomidae, the turrids and allies.

Description
The length of the shell attains 52 mm, its diameter 20 mm.

(Original description) The white shell has an ashy brown periostracum and six or more whorls, the apex eroded. The suture is slightly appressed, especially on the spire. The anal fasciole is wide and deep, somewhat in front of the suture and extending to a moderate peripheral carina.  Behind the carina, the shell is feebly, and in front of it strongly spirally grooved with wider flat interspaces. The aperture is simple. The outer lip is thin and produced. The inner lip is erased and white. The columella is gyrate but not pervious. The siphonal canal is distinct and slightly recurved.

Distribution
This marine species occurs in Monterey Bay, California, USA at a depth between 1454 m and 1593 m.

References

External links
 Smithsonian Institution: Leucosyrinx amycus
 

amycus
Gastropods described in 1919